The Battle of Nahavand, also spelled Nihavand or Nahawand, was fought in 642 between the Rashidun Muslim forces under caliph Umar and Sasanian Persian armies under King Yazdegerd III. Yazdegerd escaped to the Merv area, but was unable to raise another substantial army. It was a victory for the Rashidun Caliphate and the Persians consequently lost the surrounding cities including Spahan (Isfahan).

The former Sassanid provinces, in alliance with Parthian and White Hun nobles, resisted for about a century in the region south of the Caspian Sea, even as the Rashidun Caliphate was replaced by the Umayyads, thus perpetuating the Sassanid court styles, Zoroastrian religion, and Persian language.

Background 
At the time of the death of the Islamic Prophet Muhammad in 632, the religion that he led dominated the Hejaz (western Arabia). Under the first two caliphs Abu Bakr and Umar, Islam expanded into Palestine and Mesopotamia where it respectively confronted the East Roman and Persian (Sāsānian) empires. Both were exhausted by warfare and internal dissent. With the East Roman defeat at the Battle of Yarmouk (636), the Muslim Arabs were free to turn east to the Euphrates and the Persian heartland. In November 636 a Sāsānian army was defeated at the Battle of Qadisiya, resulting in the loss of Iraq to the Muslims.

Number of Arabs and Sasanian forces 
Following defeat by the Arabs in 639, the "King of Kings" Yazdgerd III was forced to abandon his capital at Ctesiphon. From Mesopotamia, he withdrew into the Sāsānian homeland in what is now the southern plateau of Iran. There he was able to assemble an army to replace that lost at Qadisiya.

At Nahāvand, an estimated 30,000 Arab warriors under the command of Nuʿmān attacked a Sāsānian army reportedly of ca. 100,000 men. According to Peter Crawford, the forces that gathered there is variously recorded as anything from 50,000 to 100,000. Mostly farmers and villagers, not veteran soldiers.  The Sāsānian troops, commanded by Fīrūzan, were entrenched in a strong fortified position. After an indecisive skirmish, Nuʿmān pretended to be defeated and withdrew from the battlefield. Fīrūzan then abandoned his position and pursued his foe. The pursuit proved to be a major tactical error because the Sāsānians were forced to fight on unfavourable ground; the Sāsānian army, caught between two mountain defiles, bravely fought for two days and three nights, after heavy casualties by both sides, iranians were defeated by the Arabs. Both Nuʿmān and Fīrūzan died in the battle, and Persian casualties were said to have numbered about 38,000.

Battle 
Various accounts are told about Nahāvand and the early stages of the battle. According to some versions the Persian cavalry mounted an ill-prepared pursuit of the Arabs who retreated to a more secure location. The Arabs then rallied, before surrounding and trapping the Persian force. Finally the Muslim warriors assaulted the Sāsānian host from all sides and defeated it.

According to a different version the Arab commander Nuʿmān was able to outmaneuver his Sāsānian counterpart Fīrūzan through the use of superior tactics rather than misleading rumors. The numerically superior Persians had been deployed in a strong defensive position. This would not normally have been a strategy favored by the loosely disciplined Sāsānian forces; drawn from decentralized sources and led by an alliance of feudal nobles. Nuʿmān was accordingly able to draw out the Persians from their vantage point by skirmishing advances and then a general but cohesive retreat. During the Sāsānian pursuit Fīrūzan found his horsemen caught in extended order across a rough landscape and narrow passes. The highly motivated and well-mounted Muslims then rallied and counterattacked, inflicting very heavy losses on the disorganized Persians. Both Nuʿmān and Fīrūzan were reportedly killed in the final melee but the Sāsānian defeat was total.

As the historian Tabari notes, the Persians were never again able to unite their forces in such numbers. Many of the Sāsānian nobles were already considering deserting the Empire even before the battle commenced. Many of Yazdegerd's military and civilian officials had already abandoned him.

Aftermath 
Nahāvand marked the dissolution of the Sasanian Imperial army, with the fall of the last of the grand marshals of the army and the rise of warlordism among the Persians. The Emperor Yazdegerd III attempted to raise troops by appealing to other neighbouring areas such as the princes of Tukharistan and Sogdia and eventually sent his son Peroz III to the Tang court, but without any success.

Yazdegerd hurriedly fled towards the east where he was ill-received by several Marzban (provincial governors) in the north; as well as in Merv, where the governor Mahoye openly showed his hostility to the Emperor. According to non-Muslim sources, Yazdegerd failed to rally enough support in Eastern Persia where the Sasanians were unpopular with the local population. Muslim sources, such as Tabari, reported that the province of Khorasan revolted against Sasanian rule, just as it had years earlier when the population had sided with Khosrau II's uncle Vistahm. When Yazdegerd was crowned in Estakhr, Persia had in fact three Kings ruling in different regions and Khorasan had not initially given support to Yazdegerd.

Before Yazdegerd had a chance to receive help from the Hepthalites and Turkish tribes, he was assassinated by a local miller in Merv in 651. Thereafter, Yazdegerd's son Peroz attempted to re-establish the Sasanian empire against the Rashidun Caliphate and its successor, the Umayyad Caliphate, though the plan did not develop, as Peroz ultimately died in China.

Impact 
On the long-term impact of this battle, Sir Muhammad Iqbal wrote: "If you ask me what is the most important event in the history of Islam, I shall say without any hesitation: “The Conquest of Persia.” The battle of Nehawand gave the Arabs not only a beautiful country, but also an ancient civilization; or, more properly, a people who could make a new civilisation with the Semitic and Aryan material. Our Muslim civilisation is a product of the cross-fertilization of the Semitic and the Aryan ideas. It is a child who inherits the softness and refinement of his Aryan mother, and the sterling character of his Semitic father. But for the conquest of Persia, the civilisation of Islam would have been one-sided. The conquest of Persia gave us what the conquest of Greece gave to the Romans."

References

Sources 

 
 

Battles involving the Sasanian Empire
Battles involving the Rashidun Caliphate
Muslim conquest of Persia
640s in the Rashidun Caliphate
640s in the Sasanian Empire
History of Hamadan Province